Chandra Currelley-Young (born August 30, 1961) is an American actress and singer. Currelley has done extensive work with director and writer Tyler Perry, and has played many roles in his various productions and several stage plays. In all of her stage appearances she is known for doing her signature "Holy Shake"  where she shakes her shoulders while singing and the audience responds in ovation.

Life and career 
Currelley-Young was a member of the SOS Band from the late 1980s up until 1992, when Chandra left the band to pursue a career in acting and theater. Because of her background in theater, Currelley-Young was selected by Debbie Allen to be the featured soloist in her production "Soul Possessed" which debuted at the Alliance Theater in Atlanta, Georgia.

Currelley-Young was asked to perform in the 1995 Apollo Revival of The Wiz as Evillene The Wicked Witch of The West and was then selectively chosen to act in David Petrarca's hit production, Dinah Was, the story of singer Dinah Washington. She established her acting career by appearing in Tyler Perry's  Madea's Big Happy Family and many other of his productions.

Filmography

References

External links 

 http://www.chandracurrelley.com
 http://www.tylerperry.com/

Living people
American film actresses
20th-century American actresses
African-American actresses
21st-century American actresses
American television actresses
American stage actresses
1961 births
20th-century African-American women singers
21st-century African-American women singers